Streptomyces flavovirens is a bacterium species from the genus of Streptomyces which has been isolated from soil. Streptomyces flavovirens produces the actinomycin complex and mureidomycin. A strain of this species has been used to produce pravastatin.

Further reading

See also 
 List of Streptomyces species

References

External links
Type strain of Streptomyces flavovirens at BacDive -  the Bacterial Diversity Metadatabase

flavovirens
Bacteria described in 1948